Tropical Storm Dolly was a short-lived and disorganized tropical cyclone that caused moderate damage across Tamaulipas, Mexico, in early September 2014. Originating from a tropical wave, the system first became a tropical depression late on September 1 while situated over the Bay of Campeche. Dolly struggled against strong wind shear for the duration of its existence. The large system featured multiple circulations, sometimes becoming a new dominant center and other times simply rotating around a mean vortex. As a result, multiple center relocations occurred along its general west-northwest track. Dolly eventually made landfall in Tamaulipas on September 3 before degenerating into a remnant low. The system subsequently dissipated the following day.

Prior to Dolly's landfall, schools suspended classes and officials opened shelters across Tamaulipas and Veracruz. Subsequent flooding caused damage amounting to 290.5 million pesos (US$22.2 million). One fatality was indirectly attributed to the storm. Moisture from Dolly also brought scattered storms to southern Texas.

Meteorological history

On August 19, 2014, a tropical wave emerged off the west coast of Africa. The system traversed the Atlantic over the next week with no signs of development. Convection finally increased once the wave entered the Caribbean Sea on August 27; however, it was not until August 30 when interaction with a Kelvin wave spurred organization. An area of low pressure consolidated within the system as it crossed the Yucatán Peninsula on August 31. Formation of a banding feature along the southeastern portion of the circulation on September 1 marked the system's transition into a tropical depression by 18:00 UTC while over the Bay of Campeche. During this formative stage, the depression tracked northward as its center relocated before turning to the northwest and later west. It was uncertain if a closed circulation truly existed due to conflicting data and the depression could have remained a trough until the afternoon of September 2.

Early on September 2, the depression acquired gale-force winds and became the fourth tropical storm of the 2014 season; accordingly, it was assigned the name Dolly at this time. A tight pressure gradient between Dolly and a ridge over the Gulf of Mexico created a large area of tropical storm winds along the east side of the cyclone. Data Hurricane Hunters investigating the system indicate that Dolly achieved its peak winds of  around 12:00 UTC. Slight weakening took place shortly thereafter as the center relocated to the south. During this relocation, multiple circulations were observed rotating around a mean position with yet another vortex located well to the southeast. Around 01:00 UTC on September 3, Dolly's pressure fell to 1000 mbar (hPa; 29.53 inHg) marking the storm's peak intensity. Radar observations depicted a secondary center to the north that moved ashore near Altamira an hour later. Once onshore, Dolly's circulation separated from all remaining convection and the storm degenerated into a remnant low later that day. The system subsequently dissipated early on September 4.

Preparations and impact

The remnants of Dolly brought widespread moisture to southern Texas by September 5. Scattered thunderstorms developed across the region, with some producing damaging winds. Dozens of Mexican fishing vessels sought refuge in the Port of Brownsville; however, two ran aground in the shipping channel and a third on South Padre Island. The United States Coast Guard attributed the mishaps to the sudden influx of ships.

Southerly flow from Hurricane Norbert over the Pacific brought moisture from Dolly over the Southwestern United States, resulting in possible life-threatening flash flooding.

Mexico
Coinciding with the first advisory on Tropical Depression Five late on September 1, the Government of Mexico issued a tropical storm warning for areas between Tuxpan and La Pesca. Public schools and the Autonomous University of Tamaulipas suspended classes on September 2 and 3 in Tamaulipas and Veracruz. Officials opened 53 shelters for potential evacuees. Pemex temporarily suspended operations of two oil production plants.

Between September 1–4, Dolly brought widespread heavy rains to Mexico. Flooding in Tamaulipas prompted residents to evacuate and utilize public shelters. A roof collapse at a ballpark injured two people. Losses from heavy rain in El Mante reached 7 million pesos (US$535,000), prompting a state of emergency. Total damage in the state amounted to 290.5 million pesos (US$22.2 million). Some residences temporarily lost power across Tamaulipas. Road collapses in Veracruz City damaged ten homes and four cars. One of these further threatened 40 homes in Infonavit Buena Vista within the city. A rockslide occurred in the remote community of El Tecomate. Flooding in Guanajuato caused notable disruptions and some damage. Accordingly, wind damage was limited to Cabo Rojo. One death was indirectly attributed to Dolly.

See also

Other storms of the same name
Hurricane Ingrid
Tropical Storm Fernand (2019)
Tropical Storm Hermine (2010)

References

External links
The National Hurricane Center's 
The National Hurricane Center's Advisory Archive for Tropical Storm Dolly

Dolly
Dolly 2014
Dolly 2014
Dolly 2014
Dolly